Bakestone Moor is an area of settlement in Derbyshire, England. It is located on the west side of Whitwell.

Geography of Derbyshire
Bolsover District